Wolfgang Boos (born 13 January 1946 in Füssen) is an ice hockey player who played for the West German national team. He won a bronze medal at the 1976 Winter Olympics. He is the father of Tino Boos.

References

External links
 
 
 
 

1946 births
Living people
Düsseldorfer EG players
ESV Kaufbeuren players
Ice hockey players at the 1976 Winter Olympics
Olympic ice hockey players of West Germany
West German ice hockey forwards
Olympic medalists in ice hockey
Olympic bronze medalists for West Germany
Sportspeople from Füssen
Medalists at the 1976 Winter Olympics
German ice hockey forwards